São Bartolomeu de Regatos is a parish in the municipality of Angra do Heroísmo on the island of Terceira in the Azores. The population in 2011 was 1,983, in an area of 25.00 km². The parish lies at an elevation of 22 metres. It contains the localities Calçada, Canada da Igreja, Carneiros, Cruz dos Regatos, Cova dos Regatos, Outeirão, Outeiro, Pesqueiro, Regatos, São Bartolomeu dos Regatos and São José.

References

Freguesias of Angra do Heroísmo